Kavisigamuwa is a village in Kurunegala District in the North Western Province of Sri Lanka. Kavisigamuwa is famous for the Deduru Oya anicut. Sri Gamini Central College is situated in Kavisigamuwa.

References

Populated places in Kurunegala District
Populated places in North Western Province, Sri Lanka